Van der Linde is a surname of Dutch origin. Notable people with the surname include:
Mehdi van der linde, iran 2023
Angelika van der Linde, German statistician
Christoffel van der Linde (born 1980), South African rugby union player
Etienne van der Linde (born 1978), South African racing driver, uncle of Kelvin
Kelvin van der Linde (born 1996),  South African racing driver, nephew of Etienne
Roald van der Linde (born 1968), Dutch politician
Sheldon van der Linde (born 1999), South African racing driver, younger brother of Kelvin
Wensten van der Linde (born 1990), South African footballer
 Dutch van der Linde (born 1855), fictional American outlaw - Red Dead Redemption series

See also 
 Van der Linden

Dutch-language surnames
Afrikaans-language surnames